Yali (IAST: Yāḷi), also called Vyala, is a Hindu mythological creature, portrayed with the head and the body of a lion, the trunk and the tusks of an elephant, and sometimes bearing equine features. 

The creature is represented in many South Indian temples, often sculpted onto the pillars. There also exist variations of the creature, with it possessing the appendages of other beasts. It has sometimes been described as a leogryph (part-lion and part-griffin), with some bird-like features, with the trunk referred to as a proboscis.

Iconography
Descriptions of, and references to, yalis are ancient, but they became prominent in South Indian sculptures in the 16th century. Yalis were described to be more powerful than the lion, the tiger, or the elephant. In its iconography, the yali has a cat-like graceful body, but the head of a lion with the tusks of an elephant (gaja), and the tail of a serpent. Sometimes, they have been shown standing on the back of a makara, another mythical creature and considered to be the vahana of Budha (Mercury). Some images look like three-dimensional representation of yalis. Images or icons have been found on the entrance walls of the temples, and the graceful mythical lion is believed to protect and guard the temples and ways leading to the temple. They usually have the stylised body of a lion and the head of some other beast, most often an elephant (gaja-vyala). Other common examples are: the lion-headed (simha-vyala), horse- (ashva-vyala), human- (nir-vyala) and the dog-headed (shvana-vyala) ones.

Symbolism 

The yali is said to be a guardian creature, protecting human beings both physically and spiritually. It is regarded to be a fearless beast, possessing supremacy over the animal world. It is also believed to be the symbolic representation of man's struggle with the elemental forces of nature.

Gallery

See also
 Gandaberunda
 Pratyangira
 Sharabha
 Gajasimha

References
Dictionary of Hindu Lore and Legend by Anna Dallapiccola

External links

 Photos and works on Sarabesvara
 Asian art - Yali, Sri Lanka

Hindu legendary creatures
Mythological hybrids
Mythological lions
Mythological elephants
Horses in mythology